flanders.bio, founded in 2004, is the networking organisation for the life sciences sector in Flanders and represents and supports around 350 member companies. The key strategic objectives of flanders.bio are knowledge exchange and valorisation, human capital development, internationalization of the cluster activities and visibility, familiarization of the public with products derived from the sector and the further development of a supportive environment for the members of flanders.bio.

The flanders.bio network brings together companies with activities in the life sciences – companies that are for example developing biopharmaceuticals, medical technologies or agricultural or industrial biotech products. The network also welcomes research institutes, universities and providers of capital, services and technologies to the life sciences community.

Since 2018, Willem Dhooge and Pascale Engelen are both co-General Managers at flanders.bio. They were preceded by Henk Joos, Ann De Beuckelaer, Ann Van Gysel and Els Vanheusden. Dirk Reyn (Managing Partner Bioqube Factory Fund) is Chairman of the flanders.bio Board of Directors, and Erwin Blomsma (CEO and co-founder at ViroVet) is Vice-Chairman.

See also
 Belgian Society of Biochemistry and Molecular Biology
 BIO.be
 European Federation of Pharmaceutical Industries and Associations (EFPIA)
 EuropaBio
 Flanders Institute for Biotechnology (VIB)
 Flanders Investment and Trade
 Flemish institute for technological research (VITO)
 GIMV
 Institute for the promotion of Innovation by Science and Technology (IWT)
 Participatiemaatschappij Vlaanderen
 Pharma.be
 Science and technology in Flanders

References

External links
 flanders.bio
 overview of the flanders.bio members is available on https://flanders.bio/en/member-directory

Medical and health organisations based in Belgium
Science and technology in Belgium
Flanders